Nasir Abbas Nayyar is a Pakistani Urdu language writer, critic, columnist and essayist. He has written books on poetry, literary theory and post colonial study of Urdu literature. He has produced some important books on structuralism and postmodernism and their influence on Urdu literature. A book on life and poetics of Majid Amjid is another his significant contribution. His most famous work is on Postcolonial Study of Urdu Literature published by Oxford University Press, Karachi, Pakistan titled Mabad Nau Abadiat (Urdu Kay Tanazur Mein ) and Urdu Adab ki Tashkeel e Jadid. His books on post colonialism proved ground breaking works in Urdu. 

He regularly writes on literary issues in The News  and Dawn.

Personal life
Nayyar was born on 25 April 1965 in a village of Jhang. He did his matriculation from Govt. High School Shorkot in 1981. He did his Master in Urdu from Government College University (Faisalabad) in 1990. He got his Ph.D. degree from Bahauddin Zakariya University, Multan. He was awarded a post-doctoral fellowship by (Deutscher Akademischer Austauschdienst) to pursue a research on Urdu courses of colonial period at Heidelberg University in 2011.

Career 
He is serving as professor at Institute of Urdu Language & Literature, Punjab University, Lahore in Urdu Literature . He is an honorary Editor of Bunyad - A Journal of Urdu Studies  since 2020.

He served as Director General of Urdu Science Board from December, 2017 till December, 2020.

Awards 
His book Urdu Adab ki Tashkeel e Jadid won the best Urdu Book prize in at KLF 2017 and Uss Ko Ikk Shakhs Samajhna Tou Munasib Hi Nahin won the UBL Literary Award for Best Urdu Non-Fiction book in 2019.

Bibliography

Books
 Din Dhal Chuka Tha (1993) 
 Chiragh Afreedam (2000)
 Jadidiat Say Pas e Jadidiat Tak (2000)
 Jadid or Mabad Jadid Tanqid (2004, 2013)
 Lisaniat or Tanqid (2009, 2014, 2015)
 Matn, Siaq or Tanzur (2013,2014)
 Mabad Nau Abadiat, Urdu kay Tanzur MeiN (2013)
 Majid Amjid , Hayat, Sherait or Jamaliat (2014),
 Saqafti Shankht or Istemari Ijaradari (2014)
 Aalamgiriat aur Urdu Aur Deegar Mazameen (2015)
 Urdu Adab ki Tashkeel e Jadid (2016)
 Khaak ki Mehak (2016)
 Uss Ko Ikk Shakhs Samajhna Tou Munasib Hi Nahin (2017) 
 HEIDELBERG KI DIARY (2017) 
 Farishta Nahi Aaya (2017)
 Parhain (2018)
Raakh Se Likhi Gai Kitaab (2018) 
Coloniality, Modernity and Urdu Literature (2020) 
Aik Zamana Khatam Hua Hai (2020) 
Jadeediyat aur Nauabadiyaat (2021)  
Yeh Qissa Kya Hai Maani Ka (2022) 

See also
 List of Pakistani writers
 List of Urdu writers
 Wazir Agha
 Majeed Amjad

References

Pakistani literary critics
People from Jhang District
Bahauddin Zakariya University alumni
Urdu-language non-fiction writers
Linguists of Urdu
Urdu critics
1965 births
Living people
University of the Punjab alumni
Government College University Faisalabad alumni